Khomustakh (Xomustaax) is a rural locality (a selo) in Neryuktyayinsky Rural Okrug of Megino-Kangalassky District in the Sakha Republic, Russia, located  from Nizhny Bestyakh, the administrative center of the district and  from Pavlovsk, the administrative center of the rural okrug. Its population as of the 2002 Census was 34.

References

Notes

Sources
Official website of the Sakha Republic. Registry of the Administrative-Territorial Divisions of the Sakha Republic. Megino-Kangalassky District. 

Rural localities in Megino-Kangalassky District